Luca Gobbi (born 12 June 1971) is a San Marino former footballer.

International career
Gobbi was a member of the San Marino national football team from 1990 to 2002.

External links

1971 births
Living people
Sammarinese footballers
San Marino international footballers
Association football defenders